Gomal may refer to:

Gomal, Tank, a union district in Pakistan
 Gomal River, flowing from Afghanistan to Pakistan
Gomal Dam, located on the Gomal River in South Waziristan, Pakistan
 Gomal District, a district of Paktika Province, Afghanistan
 Gomal University, located in Dera Ismail Khan, Pakistan
 Gomal Medical College, a public college in Pakistan